Daniela Merighetti (born 5 July 1981) is a retired World Cup alpine ski racer from Italy. Born in Brescia, Lombardy, she competed in the World Cup, three Winter Olympics, and five World Championships.

In the 2010 Winter Olympics, Merighetti competed in the women's downhill, combined and super-G, but failed to finish. In the 2014 Winter Olympics, she competed in the women's downhill, where she came 4th, and super-G, where she failed to finish. She did not start in the combined.

She won her first World Cup race in 2012 at age 30, in the downhill at Cortina d'Ampezzo in Italy on 14 January. It was her second World Cup podium, nearly nine years after her first in 2003.

World Cup results

Season standings

Source:

Race podiums
 1 win – (1 DH)
 6 podiums – (4 DH, 1 SG, 1 GS)

World Championship results

Olympic results

References

External links
 
  
 Salomon Racing.com – team – alpine skiing – Daniela Merighetti

1981 births
Italian female alpine skiers
Alpine skiers at the 2006 Winter Olympics
Alpine skiers at the 2010 Winter Olympics
Alpine skiers at the 2014 Winter Olympics
Olympic alpine skiers of Italy
Sportspeople from Brescia
Living people
Alpine skiers of Fiamme Gialle